The Glory Hole is a musical recording by Goodbye Mr. Mackenzie.

The Glory Hole also may refer to:

 The Glory Hole, World War I route of attack for the first day of fighting on the Somme 
 The Glory Hole, passage under High Bridge, Lincoln, in the United Kingdom
 A cupboard built into the eaves or under the stairs of some older Scottish houses and used to store rarely used or unwanted items, often in some disorder, hence the irony of the term

See also 
 Glory hole (disambiguation)